Abdinasir Ali Hassan, is a Somali Kenyan entrepreneur and the chairman of Hass Petroleum, an international oil marketing company.

Hass Petroleum
Hassan took over the company after his brother, Abdirazak Ali Hassan died. He began expanding the company reach into new markets, in Africa such as Somalia and the South Sudan. Today, Hass Petroleum operates more than 11 countries in east Africa and maintains offices in London and Dubai.

References 

Somalian businesspeople
Kenyan businesspeople
Somaliland people
Kenyan people of Somali descent
Living people
Somalilander Sunni Muslims
Somalian emigrants to the United Kingdom
Year of birth missing (living people)